Notes from the Internet Apocalypse is the first in a trilogy of books written by Cracked.com writer Wayne Gladstone entitled The Internet Apocalypse Trilogy.

The second novel in the trilogy, Agents of the Internet Apocalypse, was released on July 21, 2015.

Plot
The Internet suddenly stops working and society collapses from its loss. Internet addicts wander the streets talking to themselves, the economy crashes and the government authorizes the NET Recovery Act.

For a man named Gladstone, the Internet's vanishing comes particularly hard, following the death of his wife, when he hears rumors that someone in New York City is still online.

References

External links

2014 American novels
English-language novels
American comedy novels
Dystopian novels
Novels about the Internet
Literary trilogies
2014 debut novels
St. Martin's Press books